The Vanishing Hand theory is a concept first conceived of by economist Richard Normand Langlois.  The term is an intentional play on both Adam Smith's invisible hand and Alfred Chandler's Visible Hand.

Background
In Smith's work, his invisible hand describes the self-regulating  behavior of the market.  In essence, this theory states that individual personal motivations lead to the most efficient allocation of resources and greatest overall benefit, even if those motivations were not in any way benevolent.  This is exemplified by relatively small firms operating with no market control.  Competition between buyers and sellers channels the profit motive causing competition to lead to socially desirable outcomes.  During Smith's time and much after, this was a justification for a laissez-faire economy.  However, in Smith's day there were not several market forces that currently exist, such as large-scale industry, finance, and advertising.

The Visible hand, however, was believed by Chandler to have replaced the Invisible hand with middle management in the mid 19th century, which became “the most powerful institution in the American economy”. In short, he states that the multi-unit business structure arose because administrative coordination could yield greater profits than market coordination, giving rise to managerial hierarchy and led to furthered growth and profit.  The rise of this new system yielded major sectors of the economy being dominated and altered the structure of markets, steering away from a competitive state and to an economy controlled by corporate managers.  In other words, the large scale industries arising began to provide larger social benefits due to managerial presence and long-term scope rather than perfectly competitive markets.

Vanishing Hand theory
Langlois intended to show that Chandler's theory was partially correct but needed some reevaluation.

The Vanishing Hand theory, as argued by Dick Langlois:

In other words, the Vanishing hand theory states that initially the Visible hand is present as industries require managerial cooperation and vertical integration for long term growth, but eventually fades away to a more Invisible hand in which specialization allows for market forces to coordinate more effectively leading to a quasi-Smithian division of labor. Temporary clusters of firms arose acting under Chandler's Visible hand process that would eventually be replaced by Smith's division of labor and thus Invisible hand. Many of the large, vertically-integrated corporations of the past have broken up in recent years into more specialized firms due to the removal of barriers to trade, such as outsourcing.  Specifically it has once more become economically optimal to seek a division of labor, or seek vertical disintegration, rather than integrate.

As minimum efficient scale falls firms size should fall as well.  When firm size is viewed as firm activity undertaken, this holds true.  It is likely, therefore, that as integration becomes costlier in comparison to alternatives, large firms are more likely disintegrate to varying degrees and have a loosened managerial presence, although complete return to a Smithian market is unlikely.

References

Economic theories